Salim Abanoz (born 1 August 1969) is a Turkish judoka. He competed in the men's lightweight event at the 1996 Summer Olympics.

Achievements

References

External links

1969 births
Living people
Turkish male judoka
Olympic judoka of Turkey
Judoka at the 1996 Summer Olympics
20th-century Turkish people